The Fall Highweight Handicap is an American Thoroughbred horse race held annually near the end of November at Aqueduct Racetrack in Queens, New York. Currently run at a distance of 6 furlongs (1,207 m), it is open to horses three years of age and older under handicap conditions. The race was given its current Grade III status in 2009 by the American Graded Stakes Committee.

As the name implies, the race is known for the unusually high handicap weights assigned to each of the horses. In the past the top-weighted horse was assigned a minimum of 140 pounds (63.5 kg). Although the 140 pound rule is no longer in place, horses still carry more weight than they normally would. The highweight in the 2015 renewal, for example, carried 134 pounds.

Run at Belmont Park from its inception in 1914 to 1959 and again from 1963 to 1993, the Fall Highweight was open to horses of any age until 1959 when it was changed to its present format. It was raced on a straight course prior to 1921, from 1926 to 1939, and again from 1942 to 1957. A large field resulted in the 1976 edition being run in two divisions.

The inaugural running of the Fall Highweight in 1914 was a remarkable victory for Comely who was not only a filly that defeated male rivals, but the only two-year-old to ever win the race.

Records
Speed record:
 1:08 2/5 - Ariel Lad (1944) & Hitex (1952) - (Both were ridden by Eddie Arcaro) 

Most wins:
 2 - Miss Merriment (1934, 1936)
 2 - Cassis (1943, 1946)
 2 - Ta Wee (1969, 1970)
 2 - Honorable Miss (1975, 1976)
 2 - What A Summer (1977, 1978)

Most wins by a jockey:
 5 - Eddie Arcaro (1937, 1944, 1948, 1952, 1958)
 5 - John L. Rotz (1964, 1967, 1969, 1970, 1972)
 5 - Jorge Chavez (1991, 1995, 1996, 1998, 1999)

Most wins by a trainer:
 5 - D. Wayne Lukas (1985, 1990, 1992, 1994, 2001)

Most wins by an owner:
 4 - Joseph E. Widener (1919, 1929, 1931, 1941)<p>

Winners

* In 1918, Fairy Wand finished first, but was disqualified.

References

Aqueduct Racetrack
Horse races in the United States
Open sprint category horse races
Recurring sporting events established in 1887